Leith is a semi-rural locality in the local government areas (LGA) of Devonport and Central Coast in the North-west and west LGA region of Tasmania. The 2021 census recorded a population of 504 for the state suburb of Leith.

History 
Leith was gazetted as a locality in 1962.

Leith Post Office opened in 1890 and was closed in 1978.

Leith had a railway station in the early part of its history.

Geography
The shore of Bass Strait forms the northern boundary, and the Forth River estuary is to the west.

Road infrastructure 
The Bass Highway (National route 1) passes through from north-east to west. Route C132 (Leith Road) starts at an intersection with Route 1 and runs south along the river until it exits. Route C189 (Braddons Lookout Road) starts at the same intersection with Route 1 and also runs south until it exits.

References 

:Category:Devonport, Tasmania

Localities of Central Coast Council (Tasmania)
Towns in Tasmania